Riley Fitzsimmons (born 27 July 1996) is an Australian sprint canoeist.

He competed in the men's K-4 1000 metres at the 2016 Summer Olympics in Rio de Janeiro, and in both the men's K-2 1000 metres and men's K-4 500 metres at the 2020 Summer Olympics in Tokyo. He teamed up with Murray Stewart, Lachlan Tame and Jordan Wood in the Men's K-4 500m sprint. The team did well in the heats clocking 1:22.662, came second in the semi-final but couldn't repeat their best time in the final coming sixth behind the eventual winner, Germany,

Fitzsimmons was a life-saving champion and started kayaking to improve is surf ski skills. His greatest influence, he believes, is Lachlan Tame, the Australian Olympic bronze medalist.

References

External links

 
 
 

1996 births
Living people
Australian male canoeists
Olympic canoeists of Australia
Canoeists at the 2016 Summer Olympics
Canoeists at the 2020 Summer Olympics
ICF Canoe Sprint World Championships medalists in kayak